USS Hall may refer to more than one United States Navy ship:

 , a destroyer in commission from 1943 to 1946
 , a cargo ship in commission from 1918 to 1919
 , a cargo ship in commission from 1918 to 1919
 USS Earle B. Hall (DE-597), a destroyer escort converted during construction into the high-speed transport 
 , a high-speed transport in commission from 1945 to 1946, 1950 to 1957, and 1961 to ca. 1965
 , a cargo ship in commission from 1918 to 1919

United States Navy ship names